Arkansas State University Paragould was an instructional site of the Arkansas State University System's flagship Jonesboro campus.  The campus was located in Paragould, Arkansas.

Campus 

Arkansas State University Paragould's campus was housed in a former Wal-Mart retail store near Paragould's regional airport.  The Paragould campus closed in 2018.

Paragould
Buildings and structures in Paragould, Arkansas
Education in Greene County, Arkansas
Public universities and colleges in Arkansas